Alfons Van Brandt (Nijlen, 24 June 1927 – 24 August 2011), nicknamed Fons, was a Belgian football player who won the Belgian Golden Shoe in 1955 while at Lierse.

Van Brandt was born in Kessel. He played 38 times for the national team between 1950 and 1957, starting in a 7-2 friendly win against the Netherlands on 12 November 1950.  Van Brandt played in the 1954 FIFA World Cup.

References

External links
 

1927 births
2011 deaths
Footballers from Antwerp Province
Belgian footballers
Belgium international footballers
Lierse S.K. players
1954 FIFA World Cup players
Belgian Pro League players
People from Nijlen
Association football defenders